Prakash Chandra Sethi (19 October 1919 – 21 February 1996) was an Indian National Congress politician who served as Minister of Home Affairs (1982–84) and as the 8th Chief Minister of Madhya Pradesh (1972–75).

He was twice the chief minister of the state from 29 January 1972 to 22 March 1972 and 23 March 1972 to 22 December 1975.

Ideologically  he always appreciated people like Shankar Dayal Sharma, Ravi Shankar Shukla, Guru Radha Kishan and Gandhian Mahesh Dutt Mishra. He was such an influential person but he never encouraged anyone to take any advantage of it. Though much is not talked about him as a politician but he was from the selfless school of thoughts and accessible to the public. PC Sethi as he was popularly known, was widely respected by the people of Indore and nation for his work.

During his tenure in the central government, Sethi was elected from the Indore constituency. He also held a number of positions in the Central Government of India - Home Minister, Defence Minister, Minister of External Affairs, Finance Minister, Railways, and Housing and Development.

He is also known for his efforts for surrender of dacoits from Chambal region of Madhya Pradesh in 1976 while holding the post of Union Petroleum and Chemicals Minister.

References

External links
 Chief Ministers of Madhya Pradesh

1919 births
1996 deaths
Indian National Congress politicians from Madhya Pradesh
Chief Ministers of Madhya Pradesh
Madhya Pradesh MLAs 1972–1977
India MPs 1967–1970
India MPs 1971–1977
India MPs 1980–1984
India MPs 1984–1989
Lok Sabha members from Madhya Pradesh
Ministers of Internal Affairs of India
People from Ujjain
Rajya Sabha members from Madhya Pradesh
Chief ministers from Indian National Congress